Wilson Migueis Manafá Jancó (born 23 July 1994), known as Manafá, is a Portuguese professional footballer who plays for FC Porto as a winger or a full-back.

After making his Primeira Liga debut for Portimonense at the age of 23 he transferred to Porto for €7 million in 2019, going on to play over 100 games and win two league and Taça de Portugal doubles.

Club career

Early years
Born in Oliveira do Bairro, Aveiro District of Angolan and Bissau-Guinean descent, Manafá finished his development at Sporting CP. He made his professional debut with their reserves in the Segunda Liga, his first appearance in the competition being on 11 August 2013 when he came on as a 43rd-minute substitute in a 1–0 away loss against Atlético Clube de Portugal.

In the following years, Manafá alternated between the second and third divisions, representing S.C. Beira-Mar, Anadia F.C. and Varzim SC. He scored his first goal in the former competition on 4 April 2015 while at the service of the first club, in a 3–0 away victory over C.D. Trofense.

Portimonense
In late May 2016, Manafá joined Portimonense S.C. on a three-year contract. In his first season, he netted three times in 38 matches to help the Algarve team return to the Primeira Liga after a six-year absence.

Manafá made his debut in the Portuguese top tier on 7 August 2017, playing 16 minutes in a 2–1 home win against Boavista F.C. and providing the assist for Bruno Tabata's winner. He scored his first league goal on 25 August of the following year, also putting one past his own net in a 2–2 draw with C.D. Santa Clara also at the Estádio Municipal de Portimão. During the latter campaign, he was reconverted by manager António Folha to a full-back.

Porto
On 21 January 2019, Manafá signed a four-and-a-half-year deal with FC Porto; the initial transfer fee was €3 million for 60% of the player's economic rights, with the remainder bought for €4 million in 2020–21. He made his debut nine days later in a 3–0 home win over Belenenses SAD, playing the final ten minutes in place of Éder Militão, and scored his first goal on 4 May in a 4–0 defeat of C.D. Aves also at the Estádio do Dragão. His team lost two finals on penalties to Sporting that season: the Taça da Liga in which he was an unused substitute, and the Taça de Portugal in which he came off the bench in the 77th minute.

Manafá started regularly under Sérgio Conceição, but eventually lost his position to João Mário on the right flank and Zaidu Sanusi on the left. On 30 December 2021, shortly after having replaced the former in O Clássico against S.L. Benfica, he suffered a serious injury to his right-knee patellar tendon, subsequently undergoing surgery and missing the rest of the season.

Still injured, Manafá was one of four Porto players suspended for the 2022 Supertaça Cândido de Oliveira and fined €510 for having made insults towards Benfica during title celebrations. After recovering, he started playing again with the reserves in the second tier.

Career statistics

Club

Honours
Porto
Primeira Liga: 2019–20, 2021–22
Taça de Portugal: 2019–20, 2021–22
Supertaça Cândido de Oliveira: 2020

References

External links

1994 births
Living people
People from Oliveira do Bairro
Portuguese sportspeople of Angolan descent
Portuguese sportspeople of Bissau-Guinean descent
Sportspeople from Aveiro District
Portuguese footballers
Association football defenders
Association football wingers
Association football utility players
Primeira Liga players
Liga Portugal 2 players
Segunda Divisão players
Sporting CP B players
S.C. Beira-Mar players
Anadia F.C. players
Varzim S.C. players
Portimonense S.C. players
FC Porto players
FC Porto B players